Edappally Juma Mosque is a mosque in Edappally, Kochi, Kerala, India. It is an old mosque, the Portuguese army attacked this masjid during their rule in India to catch the Muslim freedom fighters. One of the great Indian Islamic scholar edappally Usthad K.P. Aboobacker moulavi lead the dars here for 42 years. There are 7 juma masjids and 5 non juma masjids 12 madrasas and a community hall under the edappally juma masjid .

Tourist attractions in Ernakulam district
Mosques in Kerala
Religious buildings and structures in Ernakulam district
Edappally